Claudio Barragán Escobar (born 10 April 1964) is a Spanish retired footballer who played as a striker, currently a manager.

His professional career was closely associated to Elche, as both a player and manager, but he was also an important part of the Deportivo de La Coruña teams of the 90s.

Claudio amassed La Liga totals of 259 games and 66 goals over nine seasons, also representing in the competition Mallorca and Salamanca. He added 181 matches and 32 goals in Segunda División, and started working as a coach in 2008.

Playing career

Club
Known as Claudio in his playing days, he was born in Manises, Province of Valencia, and made his senior debut at only 16 with local Levante UD. He scored three goals over two full Segunda División seasons – being relegated in 1982 – and was also loaned to lowly AgD Ceuta.

In summer 1984, Claudio signed for neighbouring Elche CF, making his La Liga debut on 18 November 1984 in a 1–0 away loss against RCD Español and finishing his first season with 18 games and two goals, including one in a 6–1 defeat at Real Madrid as the team were eventually relegated; he would achieve another promotion with the club in 1988, followed by immediate relegation.

After two top-flight seasons in RCD Mallorca, reaching the Copa del Rey final in 1990–91, Claudio joined Deportivo de La Coruña in the 1991 off-season. He netted ten times in 34 matches in his first year as the Galicians narrowly avoided relegation, beating Real Betis in the promotion/relegation playoffs.

In the following summer, however, the club bought Brazilians Bebeto and Mauro Silva, amongst others, and Super Depor came to fruition, achieving two top-two and one top-three finishes. Claudio formed an extremely efficient attacking partnership with the former, with the pair combining for 67 league goals from 1992 to 1994; he won the first and only trophy of his career in 1995, the Spanish Cup against Valencia CF, and also scored four goals in nine games in the UEFA Cup over two seasons.

Claudio lost his importance in Deportivo in the 1994–95 campaign after the emergence of younger Javier Manjarín and the summer signings of Emil Kostadinov and Julio Salinas, and left the team altogether prior to the start of the following season, after the appointment of new manager John Toshack. Aged 31, he signed with UD Salamanca, scoring 11 goals in his first year but being relegated from the top tier.

In December 1996, after suffering an injury and losing his starting place with the Castile and León side, Claudio returned to Elche, helping the club to two promotions from Segunda División B before retiring professionally at the age of 36. After two years out of football, he played a couple of seasons with amateurs Club Deportivo Alone from Guardamar del Segura, in Alicante.

International
During his spell with Deportivo, Claudio earned six caps for Spain. His debut came on 14 October 1992 in a 1994 FIFA World Cup qualifier against Northern Ireland (0–0 in Belfast).

Coaching career
Barragán joined Elche's coaching staff shortly after retiring, going on to work as an assistant with the club. Just seven games into 2008–09, he replaced fired David Vidal at the helm of the first team, finally leading them to the 12th position; he himself was sacked in early October 2009, after roughly one year in charge.

On 14 January 2011, Barragán was appointed at SD Ponferradina also in the second division, eventually not being able to prevent relegation. He immediately won promotion back with a play-off win over CD Tenerife, and remained at the club until his contract expired in June 2014.

Barragán replaced the dismissed Antonio Calderón as manager of Cádiz CF in the third tier on 24 November 2014. In his first season, the team won their group and dispatched Hércules CF in the play-off semi-finals before losing the final 3–1 on aggregate to Bilbao Athletic; he was relieved of his duties on 18 April 2016, when a run of one point in four matches put the Andalusians in fourth place.

For 42 days at the end of 2016 and the start of the new year, Barragán managed CD Mirandés in the second division, winning once and losing three of his four games in charge. In October 2017, he succeeded Gustavo Siviero at Hércules one league below. He was fired the following February, with them seven points off the play-offs and having not won in 2018.

On 11 February 2020, Barragán succeeded Alberto Monteagudo at 13th-placed Recreativo de Huelva; he signed for the rest of the campaign, with the option of one more if the team qualified for the national cup. He was dismissed on 24 January 2021 as the club eventually suffered a double relegation to the fifth tier.

Managerial statistics

Honours
Deportivo
Copa del Rey: 1994–95

References

External links

Deportivo archives

1964 births
Living people
People from Horta Oest
Sportspeople from the Province of Valencia
Spanish footballers
Footballers from the Valencian Community
Association football forwards
La Liga players
Segunda División players
Segunda División B players
Tercera División players
Levante UD footballers
Elche CF players
RCD Mallorca players
Deportivo de La Coruña players
UD Salamanca players
Spain international footballers
Spanish football managers
Segunda División managers
Segunda División B managers
Elche CF managers
SD Ponferradina managers
Cádiz CF managers
CD Mirandés managers
Hércules CF managers
Recreativo de Huelva managers